Cymbiola vespertilio, common name the bat volute, is a species of large predatory sea snail, a marine gastropod mollusk in the family Volutidae, the volutes.

Distribution
This is a Central Indo-Pacific species, found off the Philippines and Northern Australia.

Description

The size of an adult shell varies between 45 mm and 160 mm.

References

 Bail, P & Poppe, G. T. 2001. A conchological iconography: a taxonomic introduction of the recent Volutidae. Hackenheim-Conchbook, 30 pp, 5 pl.

External links

 A photo (unfortunately reversed or perhaps a rare sinistral specimen?) of a live individual of this species 
 
 

Volutidae
Gastropods described in 1758
Taxa named by Carl Linnaeus